The 2022 United States Senate election in Kansas was held on November 8, 2022, to elect a member of the United States Senate to represent the state of Kansas. Incumbent Republican Senator Jerry Moran was first elected in 2010, winning the seat vacated by Sam Brownback, and ran for re-election to a third term in office. Democrat Mark Holland, the former mayor of Kansas City, was Moran's opponent in the general election. Moran ultimately won the election.

Republican primary

Candidates

Nominee
 Jerry Moran, incumbent U.S. Senator

Eliminated in primary
Joan Farr, independent candidate for the U.S. Senate in Oklahoma in 2014 and 2020

Declined

Endorsements

Results

Democratic primary

Candidates

Nominee
Mark Holland, United Methodist pastor and former mayor of Kansas City

Eliminated in primary
 Mike Andra, farmer
 Paul Buskirk, educator
 Robert Klingenberg, salesman and truck driver
 Patrick Wiesner, bankruptcy attorney, candidate for U.S. Senate in 2010, 2014 and nominee in 2016

Results

Libertarian convention

Candidates

Nominee
David Graham, attorney

General election

Predictions

Endorsements

Polling
Graphical summary

Results

See also 
 Elections in Kansas
 Political party strength in Kansas
 Kansas Democratic Party
 Kansas Republican Party
 Government of Kansas
2022 Kansas gubernatorial election
 2022 United States House of Representatives elections in Kansas
2022 Kansas House of Representatives election
 2022 Kansas elections
 2022 United States Senate elections
 2022 United States elections

Notes

Partisan clients

References

External links 
Official campaign websites
 David Graham (L) for Senate
 Mark Holland (D) for Senate
 Jerry Moran (R) for Senate

2022
Kansas
United States Senate